This is a list of the main career statistics of Belarusian professional tennis player Victoria Azarenka. To date, she has won 33 WTA Tour level tournaments (21 in singles, nine in doubles and three in mixed doubles). Her most major titles are two Grand Slam singles titles (back-to-back Australian Open in 2012 and 2013). From the same tier, she also has four finals in doubles as well as two mixed doubles (2007 US Open and 2008 French Open). Qualified a couple of times at the year-end WTA Finals, she reached one final in 2011 when she lost to Petra Kvitová. 

She is also successful at the WTA 1000 tournaments, winning 10 in singles (six as Mandatory and four as non-Mandatory). In doubles, she won four (two Mandatory and two non-Mandatory). In 2016, in singles she achieved Sunshine Double after winning Indian Wells and Miami Open in the same year. Among other achievements, she was also successful at the national tournaments, playing for Belarus. At the 2012 Summer Olympics in London, she is the bronze medalist in women's singles and gold medalist in mixed doubles with Max Mirnyi.

Performance timelines

Only main-draw results in WTA Tour, Grand Slam tournaments, Fed Cup/Billie Jean King Cup and Olympic Games are included in win–loss records.

Singles
Current through the 2023 Dubai Open.

Doubles
Current through the 2022 Cincinnati Masters.

Mixed doubles

Grand Slam finals

Singles: 5 (2 titles, 3 runner-ups)

Doubles: 4 (4 runner-ups)

Mixed doubles: 4 (2 titles, 2 runner-ups)

Other significant finals

Olympics finals

Singles: 1 (bronze medal)

Mixed doubles: 1 (gold medal)

Year-end championships

Singles finals: 1 (1 runner-up)

WTA 1000 finals

Singles: 15 (10 titles, 5 runner-ups)

Doubles: 7 (4 titles, 3 runner-ups)

WTA career finals

Singles: 41 (21 titles, 20 runner-ups)

Doubles: 20 (9 titles, 11 runner–ups)

ITF Circuit finals

Singles: 3 (1 title, 2 runner–ups)

Doubles: 4 (3 titles, 1 runner–up)

Junior Grand Slam tournament finals

Singles: 2 (2 titles)

Doubles: 4 (4 titles)

WTA Tour career earnings
Current after the 2022 WTA Finals.

Career Grand Slam statistics

Career Grand Slam seedings 
The tournaments won by Azarenka are in boldface, and advanced into finals by Azarenka are in italics.

Best Grand Slam results details 
Grand Slam winners are in boldface, and runner–ups are in italics.

Record against other players

Azarenka's record against players who have been ranked in the top 10, active players are in boldface:

No. 1 wins

Record against top 10 players
Azarenka has a  record against players who were, at the time the match was played, ranked in the top 10.

Double bagel matches (6–0, 6–0)

Winning streaks
Victoria Azarenka has one 20+-match win streak: 26 (2012)

26-match win streak 2012
Azarenka's 26 match winning streak was the best start to a WTA Tour season since Martina Hingis won 37 in a row in 1997.

Notes

References

External links

 
 
 
 

Victoria Azarenka
Tennis career statistics